Pseudopostega caulifurcata is a moth of the family Opostegidae. It was described by Donald R. Davis and Jonas R. Stonis, 2007. It is known from south-western Brazil.

The length of the forewings is about 4.6 mm. Adults have been recorded in October.

Etymology
The species name is derived from the Latin caulis (meaning stalk, stem) and furcatus (meaning forked) in reference to the stalked, furcate caudal lobe of the male gnathos.

References

Opostegidae
Moths described in 2007